Robin Hood's Bay is a village in the Borough of Scarborough in North Yorkshire, England.

It is an ancient chapelry of Fylingdales in the wapentake of Whitby Strand. It is on the Cleveland Way national trail and also the end point of Wainwright's Coast to Coast route.

History

Toponymy
The origin of the name is uncertain, and it is doubtful that Robin Hood was ever in the vicinity of the village. An English ballad and legend tell a story of Robin Hood encountering French pirates who came to pillage the fishermen's boats and the northeast coast. The pirates surrendered and Robin Hood returned the loot to the poor people in the village that is now called Robin Hood's Bay.

Early history
By about 1000 the neighbouring hamlet of Raw and the village of Thorpe (Fylingthorpe) in Fylingdales had been settled by Norwegians and Danes. After the Norman conquest in 1069 much land in Northern England, including Fylingdales, was laid waste. William the Conqueror gave Fylingdales to Tancred the Fleming who later sold it to the Abbot of Whitby.

In the period 1324–1346 there was an early reference to Robin Hood's Bay. Louis I, Count of Flanders, wrote a letter to King Edward III in which he complained that Flemish fishermen together with their boats and catches were taken by force to Robyn Oeds Bay. The settlements were about a mile inland at Raw but by about 1500 a settlement had grown up on the coast. "Robin Hoode Baye" was mentioned by Leland in 1536 who described it as,

After the Dissolution of the Monasteries in 1540, Whitby Abbey and its lands became the property of King Henry VIII with King Street and King's Beck dating from this time.

In the 16th century, Robin Hood's Bay was a more important port than Whitby, it is described by a tiny picture of tall houses and an anchor on old North Sea charts published by Waghenaer in 1586 and now in Rotterdam's Maritime Museum.

Smuggling
The village, which consists of a maze of tiny streets, has a tradition of smuggling, and there is reputed to be a network of subterranean passageways linking the houses. During the late 18th century smuggling was rife on the Yorkshire coast. Vessels from the continent brought contraband which was distributed by contacts on land and the operations were financed by syndicates who made profits without the risks taken by the seamen and the villagers. Tea, gin, rum, brandy and tobacco were among the contraband smuggled into Yorkshire from the Netherlands and France to avoid the duty.

In 1773 two excise cutters, the Mermaid and the Eagle, were outgunned and chased out of the bay by three smuggling vessels, a schooner and two shallops. 
A pitched battle between smugglers and excise men took place in the dock over 200 casks of brandy and geneva (gin) and 15 bags of tea in 1779.

Fishing, farming and lifeboats

Fishing and farming were the original occupations followed by generations of Bay folk. Many houses in the village were built between 1650 and 1750 and whole families were involved in the fishing industry. Many families owned or part-owned cobles. Later some owned ocean-going craft. Fishing reached its peak in the mid 19th century, fishermen used the coble for line fishing in winter and a larger boat for herring fishing. Fish was loaded into panniers and men and women walked or rode over the moorland tracks to Pickering or York.

A plaque in the village records that a brig named "Visiter" ran aground in Robin Hood's Bay on 18 January 1881 during a violent storm. The road down to the sea through Robin Hood's Bay village was narrow and had awkward bends, and men had to go ahead demolishing garden walls and uprooting bushes to make a way for the lifeboat carriage. It was launched two hours after leaving Whitby, with the crew of the "Visiter" rescued on the second attempt.

The main legitimate activity had always been fishing, but this started to decline in the late 19th century. These days most of its income comes from tourism.

Robin Hood's Bay is also known for the large number of fossils which may be found on its beach. The foreshore rocks on the north side of the bay, in particular, are a well known location for finding ammonites, especially after winter storms.

In 1912, Professor Walter Garstang of Leeds University, in cooperation with Professor Alfred Denny of the University of Sheffield, established the Robin Hood's Bay Marine Laboratory, which continued on the site for the next 71 years, closing in 1983.

Governance
Robin Hood's Bay was part of the chapelry of Fylingdales in the Liberty of Whitby Strand which was a wapentake in the North Riding of Yorkshire.

Geography

Robin Hood's Bay is built in a fissure between two steep cliffs. The village houses were built mostly of sandstone with red-tiled roofs. The main street is New Road, which descends from the cliff top where the manor-house, the newer houses and the church of St Stephen stand. It passes through the village crossing the King's Beck and reaches the beach by a cobbled slipway known as Wayfoot where the beck discharges onto the beach.

The cliffs are composed of Upper Lias shale capped by Dogger and False Bedded Sandstones and shales of the Lower Oolite.

The Wine Haven Profile near Robin Hood's Bay is the Global Stratotype Section and Point (GSSP) of the Pliensbachian Epoch (183,0–189,6 mya), one of four chronographic substages of Early Jurassic Epoch.

The headlands at each end of the beach are known as Ness Point or North Cheek (north) and Old Peak or South Cheek (south).

Transport
The village was once served by Robin Hood's Bay railway station on the Scarborough and Whitby Railway line which opened in 1885 and closed in 1965. The track of the old railway is now a footpath and cycleway. The nearest railway station is in Whitby.

The village connects to the A171 allowing access to Whitby and Scarborough. The X93 Arriva bus service between Scarborough and Middlesbrough passes through Robin Hood's Bay every hour, increasing to every 30 minutes or every 20 minutes during the summer. Robin Hood's Bay is the eastern terminus of Wainwright's Coast to Coast Walk. Robin Hood's Bay is also on the coastal section of the Cleveland Way, a long-distance footpath.

Religion

Robin Hood's Bay is in the parish of Fylingdales which contains two churches both dedicated to St Stephen. The Old St Stephen's Church, Fylingdales, on the hill side at Raw, above the village, replaced an ancient church which had Saxon origins and was demolished in about 1821 and was a dependent chapel of Whitby Abbey. A new church, also St Stephen's, designed by George Edmund Street, was built in 1870.

Culture

The novel Dracula by Bram Stoker, written in 1897, has scenes set in Robin Hood's Bay. Abraham visited the area recreating the steep steps and the sightings of the red eyes, the ship that ran aground with the immense dog, the dog being none other than Dracula.

Robin Hood's Bay is the setting for the Bramblewick novels (Three Fevers, Phantom Lobster, Foreigners, Sally Lunn, Master Mariner and Sound of the Sea) by Leo Walmsley (1892–1966), who was educated in the schoolroom of the old Wesleyan Chapel, in the lower village. The 1935 film Turn of the Tide, based on Walmsley's Three Fevers, was filmed in the village.

In 1925, the Fylingdales Group of Artists was founded at Denton Hawley's studio in Robin Hood's Bay.

In 1948, LIFE magazine ran a story of an unknown Poison Penman who had been writing spiteful anonymous letters to the inhabitants of Robin Hood's Bay since 1928.

The 2008 film Wild Child contains several scenes filmed at Robin Hood's Bay. The 2017 film Phantom Thread starring Daniel Day-Lewis features a number of Robin Hood's Bay locations, including the classic interior of the Victoria Hotel and the clifftops above the village.

Missing in Time, a novel by Catherine Harriott, is set in Robin Hood's Bay and contains references and descriptions of local history, geography and culture.  "Robin Hood's Bay" is a poem by children's poet Michael Rosen.

The Bayfair newspaper contains news and local information on the village. Wireless Internet access is provided for visitors all around the village by the Bay Broadband Co-operative.

Notable people
Eileen Colwell, librarian, born in Robin Hood's Bay
Steve Huison, actor (The Full Monty), has lived in Robin Hood's Bay
Leo Walmsley, lived in the village between 1894 and 1913

Gallery

References
Notes

Bibliography

 
  (abstract)

External links

Local information
Robin Hood's Bay community information
Local Robin Hood's Bay Mini Guide
Lost Brig The brig Elizabeth Jane, launched at Guysborough, Nova Scotia, in 1817, was abandoned off Robin Hood's Bay on 8 July 1854. Her crew were picked up by the Samuel of Grimsby and set down at Bridlington Quay on the morning of 9 July. The vessel washed ashore at Ravenscar and was built into a house at Robin Hood's Bay. Her timbers, including nameboard and port of registration board, were only discovered when a cottage ceiling was removed in 2003.

Villages in North Yorkshire
National Trust properties in North Yorkshire
Bays of North Yorkshire
Tourist attractions in North Yorkshire
Populated coastal places in North Yorkshire
Fishing communities
Beaches of North Yorkshire
Fishing communities in England